ACS Omega is a weekly peer-reviewed scientific journal published since 2016 by the American Chemical Society. The editors-in-chief are Krishna Ganesh and Deqing Zhang. According to the Journal Citation Reports, the journal has a 2021 impact factor of 4.132. It is an open-access publication, which covers research in chemistry and interfacing areas of science.

References

External links

American Chemical Society academic journals
Weekly journals
English-language journals
Publications established in 2016
Chemistry journals